Avril means April in French and other languages. It may also refer to:

Places
 Mont Avril, a mountain on the Swiss-Italian border
 Avril, Meurthe-et-Moselle, a commune of the Meurthe-et-Moselle département, France

People
 Avril (name)
 Avril (singer) (born 1986), Kenyan singer and actress
 Avril (French musician) (born 1974), Frédéric Magnon
 Avril Lavigne (born 1984), Canadian pop-rock singer and songwriter
 Avril, Édouard-Henri (born 1849), French painter

Music
 Avril, a 2001 album by Laurent Voulzy
 "Avril 14th", a 2001 song by Aphex Twin 
 'Avril', an outtake from album Mouth Moods

Other uses
April in Love, 2006 French drama film, directed by Gerald Hustache-Mathieu
 Avril Group, an international French agro-industrial group
 Talgo AVRIL, a high-speed train being developed by Talgo

See also

 
 Avril-sur-Loire, a commune of the Nièvre département,  France
 April (disambiguation)